Bandonbridge was a constituency represented in the Irish House of Commons until its abolition on 1 January 1801.

Borough
This constituency was a parliamentary borough based in the town of Bandon in County Cork.

Following the Act of Union 1800, the borough retained one seat at the Union.

History
It was incorporated by charter in 1613 with a Provost, 12 Burgesses and freemen.  It had a Corporation, the patron being Francis Bernard and the electorate consisted of 13 burgesses and 50 freemen. In the Patriot Parliament of 1689 summoned by James II, Bandonbridge was represented with two members.

Members of Parliament, 1613–1801

Notes

References

Bibliography

Johnston-Liik, E. M. (2002). History of the Irish Parliament, 1692–1800, Publisher: Ulster Historical Foundation (28 Feb 2002),  
T. W. Moody, F. X. Martin, F. J. Byrne, A New History of Ireland 1534-1691, Oxford University Press, 1978
Tim Cadogan and Jeremiah Falvey, A Biographical Dictionary of Cork, 2006, Four Courts Press 

Constituencies of the Parliament of Ireland (pre-1801)
Historic constituencies in County Cork
Bandon, County Cork
1613 establishments in Ireland
1800 disestablishments in Ireland
Constituencies established in 1613
Constituencies disestablished in 1800